The 2022 season was the Tennessee Titans' 53rd in the National Football League (NFL), their 63rd overall, their 26th in the state of Tennessee and their fifth under head coach Mike Vrabel.

After racing out to a 7–3 start, the Titans suffered a late-season collapse. They ended the season on a brutal seven-game losing streak, their worst losing streak since 2015. The Titans failed to improve on their 12–5 record from last season. They also suffered their first losing season since 2015 and missed the playoffs for the first time since 2018 after a loss to the Jacksonville Jaguars in the final week of the season. It was the fourth time in franchise history they missed the playoffs after having a first-round bye in the playoffs the previous season (1994, 2001, and 2009).

Inconsistent play and a number of key injuries hindered the Titans throughout the season, including starting quarterback Ryan Tannehill who missed five games, Taylor Lewan who missed 15 games, and Harold Landry who missed the entire season. The Titans finished the season with a league-high 23 players on injured reserve.

Draft

Draft trades

Staff

Final roster

Team captains
Ryan Tannehill (QB)
Derrick Henry (RB)
Ben Jones (C)
Jeffery Simmons (DT)
Kevin Byard (FS)
Ola Adeniyi (ST)
Source:

Preseason
The Titans' preseason opponents and schedule were announced in the spring.

Regular season

Schedule
On May 9, the NFL announced that the Titans would play at the Buffalo Bills at 6:15 p.m.

The remainder of the Titans' 2022 schedule, with exact dates and times, was announced on May 12.

Note: Intra-division opponents are in bold text.

Game summaries

Week 1: vs. New York Giants

The Titans blew a 13–0 lead and lost to the Giants, 21–20, on a one-yard pass from Daniel Jones to Saquon Barkley. With the upset loss, the Titans started the season 0–1.

Week 2: at Buffalo Bills
The Titans flew to Orchard Park for their matchup against the Bills as part of a Monday Night Football doubleheader. The Bills took the opening kickoff and stormed down the field with a methodical 12-play touchdown drive to grab an early 7–0 lead. The Titans responded with a 9-play drive capped off by star running back Derrick Henry's 2-yard touchdown run. From that point on, however, it was all Bills. It started when kicker Tyler Bass converted a 49-yard field goal to go up by 3. Josh Allen then hit Stefon Diggs for the first of three touchdowns on the night for him; a sack by the Bills' defense capped off the first half, with Buffalo holding a 17–7 lead.

In the third quarter, the Bills blew the game open after Allen hit Diggs for the second of three touchdowns for the pair on the night; the Titans were quickly forced into a punt which Bass converted into his second field goal. Following the score, Tannehill was picked off at the Bills' 49-yard line. The offense capitalized on the turnover and exploited the already-exhausted Titan defense for Diggs's third touchdown catch of the night. On the Titans' next drive, Tannehill was again picked off, the interception this time going back for six courtesy of Matt Milano. By this point, the Bills had scored 24 points in the third quarter to grab a commanding 41–7 lead. Both teams' defenses took over for the rest of the game, but by this point, the game had long been decided.

With the loss, the Titans fell to 0–2.

Week 3: vs. Las Vegas Raiders

Week 4: at Indianapolis Colts

Week 5: at Washington Commanders

Week 7: vs. Indianapolis Colts

Week 8: at Houston Texans

Week 9: at Kansas City Chiefs

Week 10: vs. Denver Broncos

Week 11: at Green Bay Packers

Week 12: vs. Cincinnati Bengals

Week 13: at Philadelphia Eagles

Week 14: vs. Jacksonville Jaguars

Week 15: at Los Angeles Chargers

Week 16: vs. Houston Texans

The game was delayed an hour due to power outages in Nashville. The Titans were upset by the Texans, who had only one win entering this game. They lost their fifth straight, dropped below .500 for the first time since Week 3, and fell out of first place in the AFC South lead, as they lose the head-to-head tiebreaker to Jacksonville.

Week 17: vs. Dallas Cowboys

Week 18: at Jacksonville Jaguars

Standings

Division

Conference

References

External links
 

Tennessee
Tennessee Titans seasons
Tennessee Titans